The Palembang pitis (also spelled pitjis) was a currency issued by the Palembang Sultanate from the 1600s until 1825 when the sultanate was dissolved and its territory taken over by the colonial government of the Dutch East Indies. The currency consisted of low denomination tin alloy coins which were mostly traded in bulk. Due to the lack of a centralized mint, the pitis often had inconsistent manufacture and were frequently counterfeited.

History 

Palembang, like Banten, had become an independent sultanate when Demak Sultanate declined following the death of Sultan Trenggana in 1546. Thereafter from the 1560s to 1620s, Palembang became an active trade participant in two key products of the region, pepper and tin. During the course of this trade, coins from various local sultanates circulated in Palembang, namely Banten, Siak, Kampar and Jambi, in addition to Chinese cash coins which had already been circulating in the archipelago. Palembang's earliest coinage date from this period, which were tin imitation of Chinese cash with Chinese characters phonetically rendering "pangeran" or "sultan" into panglân (邦闌) and sútan (史丹) respectively, dated between 1600 to 1658. This was followed by an issue with Arabic Jawi inscription reading 'alamat sulṭan (علامت سلطان), dated between 1658 to 1710. The second half of the 17th century saw increasing monopoly of Dutch East Indies Company (VOC) in the pepper and tin trade. This severely undermined the regional trading network and undermined the prosperity of local sultanates. Local coins became scarce in Palembang, with the exception of coins minted at Palembang itself. Beside the pitis, the early 1700s also saw the release of VOC duiten and Spanish dollar, which also circulated in Palembang.

Around 1710, tin deposits were discovered on Bangka Island, which was part of Palembang Sultanate at the time. The discovery led to a tin surplus which was traded in form of ingots by the sultanate and provided materials for low denomination coinage in mass quantity. The eighteenth century coinage of Palembang Sultanate consisted of two separate coin series. The first is the sultan’s small-size coins bearing Jawi inscriptions, and the second is larger-size coins bearing Chinese inscription. The Chinese style coins, which were minted for the Chinese mining communities on Bangka are commonly thought to only circulate in Bangka. However, Bangka at the time had close ties with the administration of Palembang City and Chinese style coins appear to have also been minted in the city as well. It is very likely that the Chinese style coins circulated side by side with the sultan's coins within the core areas of Palembang.

In 1812, Palembang lost its source of tin when British forces occupied Bangka Island. The island went on to become a nominal Dutch possession after the Anglo-Dutch Treaty of 1814 and was formally handed over to the Dutch in 1816. Around 1820s, Sultan Mahmud Badaruddin II rose up against the Dutch and was defeated by the Dutch general Hendrik Merkus de Kock in 1821. The Dutch divested Mahmud of his powers and exiled him to Ternate in the same year. In 1825, the Dutch took Palembang under direct Dutch administration. The last dated Palembang pitis was from 1804, and presumably further production ceased by 1825.

Manufacture 
Palembang's output of coins had been fairly restrained before 1710, but tin surplus expanded the state's coinage. Pitis were cast in the same way as Chinese cash coins: molten tin was first cast into molds which resulted in "coin trees." Individual coins were then broken off and polished to round the edges, although stem remnants from unthorough polishing are commonly seen in Palembang pitis. Finally, a die is used to struck the coin with the appropriate inscription.

Official coinage issued by the Sultan formed only one part of the total coinage circulating in Palembang, as the manufacture of counterfeit coinage became a major industry. Counterfeit coins could have been made by almost anyone with access to Palembang’s tin supply during the period of tin surplus. There are reports of severe punishment against counterfeiters, but as the quality of official pitis themselves were often inconsistent due to lack of centralized manufacture, it may be difficult to ascertain whether a particular sample is official or unauthorized issue. Common inconsistencies include size, weight, and inscriptions (which were especially prone of deformation in early types).

Types 
All currency of Palembang pitis consisted of coins made from tin-lead alloy, except for a single copper issue. Each type contain inscription on the observe with blank reverse. Most contain the Arabic phrase في بلد ڤلمبڠ fi bilad Palembang ("in the land of Palembang") rendered in Jawi script, and some included year of mintage using Hijri era or Anno Hegirae (AH). Coins could be divided into two categories: coins without a hole called  pitis buntu and coins with a hole called pitis teboh, which included Chinese cash imitations. Disregarding variants, some of the known types produced by the official Palembang mint are as following:

Pitis Buntu

Pitis Teboh

Exchange Rate
Palembang pitis served as low denomination currency valued and exchanged in bulks with the VOC duiten and Spanish dollar. Buntu and teboh were worth the same and they only differed in their group units. Pitis buntu were grouped into parcels wrapped in leaves. A parcel with 250 pieces is known as a kupat (كوفات) which has the value of one kejer equivalent to 20 duiten and  dollar. Pitis teboh were grouped into strings with a piece of rattan or twine, similar to Chinese cash. A string with 500 pieces is known as cucuk (چوچق) which has the value of one tali equivalent to two kejer. Known units of value and their exchange rate are shown below.

See also 

 Early Nusantara coins
 Cash coins in Indonesia
 Brunei pitis

Notes

References

Bibliography

External links 

Currencies of Indonesia
Economy of Indonesia